Events in the year 1980 in Liberia.

Incumbents 
 President
William Tolbert (until April 12)
Samuel Doe (from April 14, as Chairman of the People's Redemption Council)
 Vice President 
Bennie Dee Warner (until April 12)
Thomas Weh Syen (from April 14, as Co-Chairman of the People's Redemption Council)
 Chief Justice
James A. A. Pierre (until April 12)
Emmanuel Gbalazeh (after April 14)

Events
 January 8 – The Progressive People's Party is registered.
 March 10 – George Boley is arrested on charges of treason and sedition.
 March 28 – The oppositional Progressive People's Party is banned by an act of the Legislature of Liberia.
 March 31 – Liberia establishes diplomatic ties with Ecuador.
April 12 – 1980 Liberian coup d'état 
 President William Tolbert is assassinated following an attack led by seventeen members of the Armed Forces of Liberia on the Executive Mansion.
 The Liberian Constitution of 1847 is suspended.
George Boley is released from prison.
April 14 – The People's Redemption Council is established, with Samuel Doe as its chairman, and head of state of Liberia.
April 22 – The Doe regime executes five of President Tolbert's cabinet ministers and eight former Liberian officials by firing squad.
April 30 – Former Vice President Bennie Dee Warner announces the formation of a government-in-exile in Ivory Coast with the intention of overthrowing the Doe regime.
August 26 – Doe leaves to visit Addis Ababa, Ethiopia in his first international visit since his taking power.
Full date unknown
Matilda Newport Day is abolished.
Liberia establishes formal diplomatic relations with Libya.

Births
 May 22 – Eddie Watson, Liberian-born Ghanaian actor

Deaths
 April 12 – William Tolbert, President of Liberia, in Monrovia (b. 1913)
 April 22 – Thirteen officials executed by the Doe Regime, including:
Cyril Bright, former Minister of Planning and Economic Affairs
Joseph J. Chesson, Minister of Justice
Cecil Dennis, Secretary of State (b. 1931)
Richard A. Henries, Speaker of the House of Representatives (b. 1908)
Charles T. O. King, Deputy Minister for Agriculture
David Franklin Neal, former Minister of Planning and Economic Affairs
P. Clarence Parker II, Chairman of the National Investment Council and Treasurer of the True Whig Party
James T. Phillips, former Minister of Finance and former Minister of Agriculture
James A. A. Pierre, Chief Justice of the Supreme Court (b. 1908)
John W. Sherman, Assistant Minister of Commerce and Trade
Frank J. Stewart Sr., Director of the Budget
Frank E. Tolbert, President Pro-Tempore of the Senate (b. 1910)
E. Reginald Townsend, Chairman of the True Whig Party (b. 1917)
 November 10 – Momolu Dukuly, former Secretary of State, in Monrovia (b. 1903)

References 

 
1980s in Liberia
Years of the 20th century in Liberia
Liberia
Liberia